Wien St.Marx, also referred to as Vienna Bio Center/St. Marx, is a railway station serving Landstraße, the third district of Vienna. It was rebuilt in 2002 as part of a project to relocate the Aspangbahn to an underground tunnel.

Images

References 

Railway stations in Vienna
Austrian Federal Railways